5F-ADB (also known as 5F-MDMB-PINACA) is an indazole-based synthetic cannabinoid from the indazole-3-carboxamide family, which has been used as an active ingredient in synthetic cannabis products and has been sold online as a designer drug. 5F-ADB is a potent agonist of the CB1 receptor, though it is unclear whether it is selective for this target. 5F-ADB was first identified in November 2014 from post-mortem samples taken from an individual who had died after using a product containing this substance. Subsequent testing identified 5F-ADB to have been present in a total of ten people who had died from unexplained drug overdoses in Japan between September 2014 and December 2014. 5F-ADB is believed to be extremely potent based on the very low levels detected in tissue samples, and appears to be significantly more toxic than earlier synthetic cannabinoid drugs that had previously been sold.

In 2018, 5F-ADB was the most common synthetic cannabinoid to be identified in Drug Enforcement Administration seizures.  5F-ADB was also identified in cannabidiol (CBD) products from a US-based CBD manufacturer in 2018.

Deaths
5F-MDMB-PINACA has been associated with 25 deaths in Europe between 2015 and 2017.

Legal status
In the United States, 5F-ADB is a schedule I controlled substance.

5F-ADB was added to the Japanese banned drug list in December 2014.

See also

 5F-AB-PINACA
 5F-AMB
 5F-APINACA
 AB-CHMINACA
 AB-FUBINACA
 AB-CHFUPYCA
 AB-PINACA
 ADB-BINACA
 ADB-CHMINACA
 ADB-FUBINACA
 ADB-PINACA
 ADBICA
 APICA
 APINACA
 MDMB-CHMICA
 MDMB-FUBINACA
 PX-3

References

Cannabinoids
Designer drugs
Organofluorides
Indazolecarboxamides
Tert-butyl compounds